Igor Oberberg (1907–1996) was a Russian Empire-born German cinematographer. His younger sister Ira Oberberg became a film editor.

Life and career 
Oberberg came to Germany in 1919. From 1926 to 1927 he completed a photographic education at the Photoshule Lette club. In 1927 he began to work as a clutter assistant for the movie. After that he became a camera assistant and worked in this function at numerous productions. Since 1939 he was chief cameraman and mostly participated in entertainment films, but also on propaganda films like submarines westward! and GPU.

Selected filmography
 Congo Express (1939)
 The Red Terror (1942)
 Under the Bridges (1946)
 In Those Days (1947)
 The Prisoner (1949)
 This Man Belongs to Me (1950)
 The Beautiful Galatea (1950)
 A Day Will Come (1950)
 The Sinful Border (1951)
 Toxi (1952)
 Homesick for You (1952)
 Queen of the Arena (1952)
 The Dancing Heart (1953)
 The Stronger Woman (1953)
 Captain Wronski (1954)
 The Perfect Couple (1954)
 The Captain and His Hero (1955)
 Das Mädchen Marion (1956)
 The Twins from Immenhof (1973)
 Spring in Immenhof (1974)

References

Bibliography 
 Fenner, Angelica. Race Under Reconstruction in German Cinema: Robert Stemmle's Toxi. University of Toronto Press, 2011.

External links

1907 births
1996 deaths
German cinematographers
Emigrants from the Russian Empire to Germany